The Hole is a small neighborhood in New York City on the border between Brooklyn and Queens. It is a low-lying area, with a ground level that is  lower than the surrounding area. The area is run-down, and suffers from frequent flooding. It has been described as a "lost neighborhood," and as resembling a border town from the Wild West. It is generally bordered by Eldert Lane, 78th (Sapphire) Street, South Conduit Avenue, and Linden Boulevard. Nearby neighborhoods include East New York, Lindenwood, and Ozone Park. 

The Hole is home to the New York City Federation of Black Cowboys. 

In the 1960s, the level of some streets within The Hole were raised and the streets paved, facilitating passage between South Conduit Avenue and Linden Boulevard. This required homes adjacent to the raised streets to build retaining walls with the first level of their houses now below grade.  In 2004, the Department of Environmental Protection (DEP) made plans to connect the neighborhood to the city's sewer system to combat the flooding by raising the land.  

In 2010, filmmakers Courtney Fathom Sell and Billy Feldman made a short documentary about the neighborhood. The film includes interviews with some of the residents as well as members of the Federation of Black Cowboys. The film premiered at Rooftop Films in 2011 and has since been archived at the Brooklyn Historical Society & Anthology Film Archives.
Another film, focused on the residents living in the Hole, was made in 2016.

The Hole is the site of an old Mafia graveyard, located in a vacant lot off of 78th (Sapphire) Street between Blake and Dumont Avenues. In 1981, children playing in the lot found the body of Bonanno crime family capo Alphonse "Al" Indelicato, who, along with fellow Bonanno capos Philip "Philly Lucky" Giaccone and Dominick "Big Trin" Trinchera, had been killed several weeks before in a Brooklyn night club store room by rival Bonanno capo Joseph Massino and his associates. In 2004, the bodies of Giaccone and Trinchera were dug up in the lot by FBI agents and New York City police detectives. The bodies were disposed of in the lot as a favor by the crew of John Gotti, who had grown up with Massino. Although not all of their bodies have been found, as many as six Mafia murder victims are believed by authorities to have been buried in the lot in the late 1970s and early 1980s. These include John Favara, a Queens furniture store manager killed because he accidentally ran over the 12-year-old son of John Gotti, and Lucchese crime family members Joseph Spione and Thomas DeSimone, on whom Joe Pesci's character Tommy DeVito in Goodfellas was based.

References

External links
 City officials offer a glimmer of hope for 'The Hole,' after decades of neglect

Neighborhoods in Queens, New York
Neighborhoods in Brooklyn